The 2006 United States House of Representatives elections in Ohio were held on Tuesday, November 7, 2006 to elect the 18 U.S. representatives from the state of Ohio, one from each of the state's 18 congressional districts. The elections coincided with the elections of other federal and state offices, including a gubernatorial election.

Overview

District 1

Primary results

General election results

District 2

Primary results

General election results

District 3

Primary results

Studebaker withdrew her candidacy on August 15, 2006, following an arrest for a domestic dispute with her husband.

A special primary election to fill the vacancy was held on September 15, 2006

Special primary results

General election results

District 4

Primary results

General election results

District 5

Primary results

General election results

District 6

Primary results

General election results

District 7

Primary results

General election results

District 8

Primary results

General election results

District 9

Primary results

General election results

District 10

Primary results

General election results

District 11

Primary results

General election results

District 12

Primary results

General election results

District 13

Primary results

General election results

District 14

Primary results

General election results

District 15

Primary results

General election results

District 16

Primary results

General election results

District 17

Primary results

General election results

District 18

Primary results

Special primary results

General election results

References

Ohio

2006
2006 Ohio elections